The Gosfield North Communications Co-operative (also known as the Gosfield North Telephone Company) is a small independent telephone company based in Cottam, Ontario in Essex County, Ontario. It is the only independent telephone co-operative in Essex County.

Gosfield North handles the 839 telephone exchange in the 519 area code. it is named for the former Township, Gosfield North Township, Ontario, which is now a part of the town of Kingsville, Ontario.

The company began in 1907 with five phones in service. They also have high speed internet and TV with some loveable MPEG-4 HD channels.

References

External links 
 

Telecommunications companies of Canada
Media cooperatives in Canada
Telecommunications companies established in 1907
1907 establishments in Ontario